Ronald Dixon (born May 28, 1976) is a former American football wide receiver for the New York Giants in the National Football League. He was drafted in the third round of the 2000 NFL Draft. His most notable performance was his 97-yard kick return for a touchdown in Super Bowl XXXV.  Dixon's return was the only score for the Giants as they went on to lose to the Baltimore Ravens 34–7.  He also recorded a 97-yard kickoff return for a touchdown in the Giants win over the Philadelphia Eagles in the Divisional playoffs that year.  As a result, he holds the record for the most kickoff returns for a touchdown in a postseason campaign (2).

Dixon's career was once promising but was prematurely ended by a PCL injury in his left knee.

Ron had try outs with the Miami Dolphins and the New Orleans Saints in the spring of 2005, but his knee injury was not healed enough for him to be effective, so he officially retired from the NFL as a vested veteran in 2005.

Dixon has now moved to Orlando, Florida where he is a health insurance agent and the Director of Public Relations for the  Tenncom Group, an insurance agency and Professional Employer Organization (PEO) brokerage.  He is now in the process of developing a health/disability insurance program for athletes to insure against career ending injuries.

Ron Dixon was once an intern on the Shannon Burke Show which aired on Real Radio in Orlando Florida. He also coached at Olympia High School. Dixon is an alumnus of Wildwood High School.

External links
 http://tenncomgroup.com/aboutus.php

1976 births
Living people
People from Wildwood, Florida
Players of American football from Florida
American football wide receivers
Itawamba Indians football players
Lambuth Eagles football players
New York Giants players
West Georgia Wolves football players